Séguier is a French surname.

 Atlantica-Séguier (Created in 1984), French publishing house.
 Jean-François Séguier (1703–1784), French astronomer and botanist from Nîmes
 Margaret Seguier (died 1870), British artist
 Pierre Séguier (1588–1672), French statesman, chancellor of France from 1635. He is known for his appearance in The Three Musketeers.
 William Seguier (1772–1843), British art dealer, painter, and functionary in the art world. He was the first Keeper of the National Gallery, London.